Victory State Forest covers  in Concord, Granby, Lunenburg, and Victory, Vermont in Essex County. The forest is managed by the Vermont Department of Forests, Parks, and Recreation mainly for timber resources and wildlife habitat.

Activities in the forest include hunting, trapping, wildlife viewing, snowmobiling, hiking, snowshoeing, and horseback riding. Portions of the forest are open for primitive camping.

References

External links
Official website
Travel the Kingdom - Victory State Forest & Victory Basin WMA

Vermont state forests
Protected areas of Essex County, Vermont
Victory, Vermont
Concord, Vermont
Granby, Vermont
Lunenburg, Vermont